Tomahawk Technique is the fifth studio album by Jamaican dancehall recording artist Sean Paul, released in several countries by Atlantic Records (Warner Music Group) on 24 January 2012.  The album was released eight months later in the United States. It was also Grammy-nominated for Best Reggae Album at the 55th Annual Grammy Awards.

Background 
Sean said to music blog Rap-Up that Akon, Stargate, DJ Ammo, Benny Blanco, and Kelly Rowland, would appear on the album.
"There's a broadening of my artistry, I’m working with other producers and artists I’ve never worked with," the Jamaican DJ told Reuters at the recent KIIS FM Jingle Bell Ball in Los Angeles.
Tomahawk Technique follows the success of the singer's 2009's record Imperial Blaze. For the new CD, he has teamed up with producers Rico Love, Benny Blanco and Stargate, who have been behind artists such as Katy Perry, Rihanna and Natasha Bedingfield, to work on his new album.
"What’s going to surprise fans is that there’s a lot more singing, more high notes that I never used to do before," said Paul, adding "it’s a mixture of pop music into dance music."

"I’m trying to bridge the gap, broaden my artistry," Sean told Rap-Up TV. "I’m asking [the producers] to try and make dancehall from their perspective. So it’s sounding more international than dancehall." The album's Japanese version features an upcoming Jamaican singer/songwriter, Zia Benjamin, as well as a remix of the song "Dream Girl" featuring Japanese artiste, Lecca.

Singles 
The first single "Got 2 Luv U" features vocals from American singer Alexis Jordan. It was released on 19 July 2011 by Atlantic Records. The song was written by Sean Paul, Ryan Tedder and Stargate, and it was produced by Stargate. It reached number 1 in Switzerland and the Top 10 in several countries worldwide.

"She Doesn't Mind" was released as the second single taken from Tomahawk Technique. It was written by Sean Paul, Shellback and Benny Blanco and was produced by Shellback and Benny Blanco. It was released on 29 September 2011 on NRJ & Skyrock (French radios), and to iTunes on 31 October. Like its predecessor, "She Doesn't Mind" topped the Swiss Singles Chart as well as the Austrian Singles chart and reached top-ten in many other European territories. "Hold On" was released as the third single in February 2012. It reached number 1 in Belgium and number 35 in France.  "Dream Girl (remix)" featuring Lecca was released as a single in Japan on 28 March 2012 while in  the United States, "How Deep Is Your Love" featuring Kelly Rowland was released as the fifth single on 24 July 2012. The single has so far reached number seventy-two in Switzerland.

Track listing

Charts

Weekly charts

Year-end charts

Certifications

Release history

References

External links
 

2012 albums
Sean Paul albums
Atlantic Records albums
VP Records albums
Albums produced by Benny Blanco
Albums produced by Rico Love
Albums produced by Stargate
Albums produced by Shellback (record producer)